Autotransplantation is the transplantation of organs, tissues, or even particular proteins from one part of the body to another in the same person (auto- meaning "self" in Greek).

The autologous tissue (also called autogenous, autogeneic, or autogenic tissue) transplanted by such a procedure is called an autograft or autotransplant.

It is contrasted with allotransplantation (from other individual of the same species), syngeneic transplantation (grafts transplanted between two genetically identical individuals of the same species) and xenotransplantation (from other species).

A common example is the removal of a piece of bone (usually from the hip) and its being ground into a paste for the reconstruction of another portion of bone.

Autotransplantation, although most common with blood, bone, or skin, can be used for a wide variety of organs. One of the rare examples is autotransplantation of a kidney from one side of the body to the other. Kidney autotransplantation is used as a treatment for nutcracker syndrome.

Autologous blood donation 

In blood banking terminology, autologous blood donation refers to a blood donation marked for use by the donor, typically for a scheduled surgery. (Generally, the notion of "donation" does not refer to giving to oneself, though in this context it has become somewhat acceptably idiomatic.) They are commonly called "autos" by blood bank personnel, and it is one major form of the more general concept of autotransfusion (the other being intraoperative blood salvage).

Some advantages of autologous blood donation are:
 Blood type will always match, even with a rare blood type or antibody type.
 If only autologous blood is used during surgery the risk of exposure to infectious disease such as hepatitis or HIV from blood is eliminated.
 The risk of allergic reactions is reduced.

The disadvantages are:
 Higher cost due to individualized processing, record-keeping, and management.
 In most cases, the blood is discarded if it is not used instead of being added to the general supply.
 Blood donation prior to colorectal cancer surgery seemed causative for a worse overall and colorectal cancer specific survival.

Autologous blood is not routinely tested for infectious diseases markers such as HIV antibodies. In the United States, autologous blood is tested only if it is collected in one place and shipped to another.

There is also a risk that, in an emergency or if more blood is required than has been set aside in advance, the patient could still be exposed to donor blood instead of autologous blood. Autologous donation is also not suitable for patients who are medically unable to or advised not to give blood, such as cardiac patients or small children and infants.

Bone autograft 

In orthopaedic medicine, a bone graft can be sourced from a patient's own bone in order to fill space and produce an osteogenic response in a bone defect. However, due to the donor-site morbidity associated with autograft, other methods such as bone allograft and bone morphogenetic proteins and synthetic graft materials are often used as alternatives.  Autografts have long been considered the "Gold Standard" in oral surgery and implant dentistry because it offered the best regeneration results.  Lately, the introduction of morphogen-enhanced bone graft substitutes have shown similar success rates and quality of regeneration; however, their price is still very high.

Organ autotransplantation 
Autotransplantation of selected organs is often preceded by ex vivo (also bench, back-table, or extracorporeal) surgery. For example, ex vivo liver resection and autotransplantation is used in the treatment of selected cases of conventionally unresectable hepatic tumors. It can also be implemented in rare scenarios of a blunt abdominal trauma. Kidney autotransplantation is a method of a nephron-sparing renal tumor excision or complex renal artery aneurysm management. The uses of ex vivo surgery followed by autotransplantation were reported also for heart, lungs and intestines, including multivisceral approaches.

See also
 Autotransfusion
 Replantation
 Rotationplasty
 Spleen transplantation
 Stem cell fat grafting

References

Transfusion medicine
Orthopedic surgical procedures
Transplantation medicine